The  superyacht Ragnar was launched by ICON Yachts at their yard in Harlingen and delivered later that same year to Russian millionaire Vladimir Strzhalkovsky.

History 
The Yacht Ragnar started out as an offshore supply vessel named Sanaborg for Wagenborg built in 2012 by Koninklijke Niestern Sander at their yard in Farmsum.

Conversion 
In 2017 Sanneborg was acquired by ICON Yachts as a starting point for the conversion to what later would become the yacht Ragnar after being laid up in 2015. Ragnar was launched 24 January 2020 and delivered later that year.

2022 citizen's arrest 
Following the 2022 Russian invasion of Ukraine, the yacht was boarded on 23 February 2022 for an inspection by the Norwegian authorities because the owner has ties to the Kremlin. Ragnar was allowed to leave but because the owner is Russian, local fuel - and supply companies refused to sell to the yacht causing her to be stuck in Narvik for almost 2 months. The Norwegian government had to order a different company to deliver fuel so she could leave.

Design 
The hull and the existing superstructure were built out of steel. The new parts of the superstructure that were added during the conversion were also made made out of steel but with teak decks. The yacht is classed by Bureau Veritas and flagged in Malta.

Amenities 
Zero speed stabilizers, gym, air conditioning, BBQ, spa room, sauna, jacuzzi. There is also a commercial graded helicopter landing pad on the upperdeck.

Tenders 
 Two  tenders
 Two  RHIBs

Recreational toys 
U-Boat Worx C-Explorer 3, Ripsaw EV2, 4x Ribeye jet-skis, 4x snowmobiles, 4x amphibious ATV's.

Performance 
She is powered by twin 2,682hp Caterpillar (3516C-HD) diesel engines.

See also
 MY Legend
 Yachts impacted by international sanctions following the Russian invasion of Ukraine

References

2012 ships
Motor yachts
Ships built in the Netherlands